Beach handball competitions at the 2019 World Beach Games in Al Rayyan, Qatar are scheduled to be held from October 9 (a day before the opening ceremony) to October 14. The venue for the competition is located at Al-Gharafa. A total of twelve men's and twelve women's teams (each consisting up to 10 athletes) competed in each tournament. This means a total of 240 athletes are scheduled to compete.

Qualification
Each National Olympic Committee might enter up to one men's and one women's team in the handball tournaments. The qualification processes for the men's and women's events were similar. The host country was guaranteed an entry in each event, as was the Top five Beach Handball World Championships. 6 more spots were awarded to the winners of continental qualification tournaments (for Africa, Asia, Europe, North America, Oceania, and South America).

Men's qualification

Women's qualification

Medal summary

Medal table

Medalists

Participating nations

References

External links
Results book

Beach handball at multi-sport events
Beach handball
World Beach Games
2019